John McGill may refer to:
Biraban (died 1846), indigenous Australian leader known to Europeans as John McGill
Jack McGill (ice hockey, born 1921) (1921–1994), ice hockey player
Jack McGill (ice hockey, born 1909) (1909–1988), ice hockey player
J. Yancey McGill (born 1952), South Carolina senator
John McGill (bishop) (1809–1872), American prelate of the Roman Catholic Church
John Jones McGill (1860–1918), industrialist and philanthropist from Montreal, Québec
John McGill (politician) (1752–1834), Upper Canada politician (Auditor General of Land Patents 1813-1818) and army officer

See also
Jack McGill (disambiguation)